Lee Jung-Suk (born July 6, 1982 in South Korea) is a South Korean retired professional basketball player. He spent most of his playing career at the Seoul Samsung Thunders of the Korean Basketball League and also played for the South Korean national team at the 2009 FIBA Asia Championship and the 2010 Asian Games.

Career

Early years
Lee attended Yongsan High School where he was a junior of Yang Dong-geun. He played college basketball for Yonsei University.

Professional
Lee was selected by Anyang SBS Stars in the 2004 KBL draft as the second overall pick. The team finished third in the regular season and advanced to the semi-finals of the play-offs. He was traded to Seoul Samsung Thunders for Joo Hee-jung at the end of the season.

Lee spent the next decade at Seoul Samsung Thunders. During the team's successful run to the 2005–06 championship, he was a core member of a formidable squad that included Kang Hyuk, Lee Kyu-sup and Seo Jang-hoon. Due to Lee Kyu-sup and Seo's height (both were over 6 feet and 6 inches tall), the team's quick and physical offensive style was nicknamed "high altitude basketball" by the press. That team was dubbed "Guard Kingdom" by fans because of their strong depth chart consisting of guards who possessed physicality, shooting prowess and defensive ability.

National team
At the 2009 FIBA Asia Championship, Lee helped the Koreans to a seventh-place finish while averaging a team-leading three assists per game.  Despite his efforts, Korea failed to qualify for the semifinals of the tournament for the first time in their 25 tournament appearances.

References

1982 births
Living people
South Korean men's basketball players
Korean Basketball League players
Seoul Samsung Thunders players
Asian Games medalists in basketball
Basketball players at the 2010 Asian Games
Anyang KGC players
Yonsei University alumni
Guards (basketball)
Asian Games silver medalists for South Korea
Medalists at the 2010 Asian Games